Stand Cricket Club, established in 1853, The SCG is situated between Hamilton Road and Higher Lane in Whitefield, Bury,  Greater Manchester. The club was founder members of the North Western Cricket league  which formed into the Lancashire and Cheshire Cricket League until 1992 when they became  a member of the Central Lancashire League between 1993 and 2004 in which Stand CC had limited success(highest position 4th 1995), moved into the Lancashire County League for the 2005 season. Since joining the LCL the club have won the Walkden Cup (2008), the Hulme Trophy (2009), the 2nd XI Last Six Competition (2010) and the 3rd XI League, the Bryden Trophy (2006, 2007, 2008). Stand are Founder members of the Greater Manchester Cricket League in 2016.Winning the Second Division as champions and the First Division Title  in 2018.

For the 2019 season the club will be running three senior teams and five junior teams (U9s, U11s, U13s, U15s, and U18s).

First Class players have included Warren Hegg of Lancashire County Cricket Club and England, Norman McVicker of Warwickshire CC and Leicestershire CC Hugh Milling of Ireland.

Club honours list

1XI
1941 Lancashire and Cheshire Champions
1951 Lancashire and Cheshire Champions
1961 Lancashire and Cheshire Champions and Walkden cup winners Saville Whittle Shield winners
1962 Walken Cup Winners
1986 Lancashire and Cheshire Division Two Runners Up
1988 Hough Shield Winners
1989 Hough Shield Runners Up
2008 Walkden Cup Winners  MOM S Catterall
2016 Greater Manchester Cricket League Division Two Champion's
2018 Greater Manchester Cricket League Division One Champion's

2XI
1977 Hulme cup winners
1985 Lancs and Cheshire 1st Division Champions 
1985 Hulme cup runners Up
1988 Lancs and Cheshire 2nd Division Champions
2009 Hulme Trophy Winners MOM D. Foreman
2009 LCL Sportsman's Trophy 
2010 LCL Last Six Competition Winners
2016 GMCL 4th Division Promotion
2019 GMCL 3rd Division Promotion

3XI
1982 North Manchester 3rd Division Winners Stokes Cup Winners
1983 Hodgson Cup Runners up
1990 North Manchester 2nd Division Runners Up
1991 Hodson Cup Winners MOM B.McVicker
1999 North Manchester 3rd Division Runners Up
2002 Stokes Cup Runners Up
2003 CLL Division and Cup winners
2006 LCC Division winners
2007 LCC Division winners
2008 LCC Division winners
2019 GMCL Division C Winners

U18s
1978 Greenhaugh Cup Runners up
1979 Division Runners up
1980 Greenhaulgh Cup winners
1984 Division Winners and Greenhalgh Cup Winners
2007 Greenhaugh Cup Winners

Other awards

2009 LCL Sportsmanship Trophy

Professionals and Overseas Amateurs

Professionals
1981         Jim Kenyon          (Eng)
1982         Jim Kenyon          (Eng)
1983         Jim Kenyon          (Eng)
1984         Jim Kenyon          (Eng)
1985         Steve Burnage       (Eng)
1986         Dave(Percy)Parsons  (Eng)
1987         Dave(Percy)Parsons  (Eng)
1988         Dave(Percy)Parsons  (Eng)
1989         Franny Daly         (Eng)
1990         Franny Daly         (Eng)
1991         Dave Townley        (Aus)
1992         Andy Williams       (Eng)
1993         Michael J Warden    (Aus)
1994         Michael J Warden    (Aus)
1995         Michael J Warden    (Aus)
1996         Michael J Warden    (Aus)
1997         Michael J Warden    (Aus)
1998         Michael J Warden    (Aus)
1999         Sampath             (SL)
2000         Brad Flegg          (SA)
2001         Brad Flegg          (SA)
2002         Martin Hegg         (Eng)
2003         Martin Hegg         (Eng)
2004         John Seedle         (Eng)
2005         John Seedle         (Eng)
2006         Trent Scott         (Aus)
2007         Trent Scott         (Aus)
2008         Naranjan Kumara     (SL)
2009         Amila Wethhassinghe (SL)
2010         Amila Weththasinghe (SL)
2011         James Cutt          (Eng)
2012         No Professional
2013         No Professional
2014         No Professional
2015         Chandi Kumara       (Pak)
2016         Ali Azmat           (Pak)  
2017         Ali Azmat           (Pak)
2018         Geshan Wimaladharma  (SL)
2019         N. Nawella           (SL)
2020         Chris Williams       (Eng) 
2021         Chris Williams(Eng)
2022        Chris Williams (Eng)

Overseas Amateurs

1984          Dave Townley        (Aus)
1993          Geoff Nelson        (Aus)
1994          Dean Temple         (Aus)
1995          Dean Temple         (Aus)
2001          Josh McClean        (Aus)
2012          Brett Ernst         (Aus)
2014          Brett Ernst         (Aus)
2018          J. Sukhon           (NZ)
2019          J. Sukhon           (NZ)
2022          D.Faram (Aus)
Dean Temple broke and held the amateur batting record for the number of runs scored in the 1995 season
Michael J Warden took over 600 wickets

References

External links
 Official website
 https://cricketarchive.com/Lancashire/Players/62/62957/62957.html

Central Lancashire League cricket clubs
Sport in the Metropolitan Borough of Bury
1853 establishments in England